The Santa Fe Rail Trail is a multi-use trail, part of the trail system in the city of Santa Fe, New Mexico. The trail begins at the Santa Fe Depot, in the Railyard arts district, and ends at U.S. Route 285, near Lamy, New Mexico and the Lamy station. An example of Rails with trails, it parallels the New Mexico Rail Runner Express tracks to roughly I-25, where it then continues along the Santa Fe Southern Railway. The Santa Fe Rail trail is 15 miles long, is asphalted for the first 3.5 miles, and improved natural surface for 11.5 miles. The last few miles between Eldorado and US-285 is unimproved natural surface.

Trailheads, crossings and access 

The Santa Fe Rail Trail can be accessed via trailheads, connecting trails, and intersecting roadways in Santa Fe and Eldorado. The New Mexico Rail Runner Express has stops on the trail at the Santa Fe Depot, South Capitol station, and Zia Road station. Major connecting trails are the Arroyo de los Chamisos Trail (paved), the Spur Trail (improved natural surface), and Galisteo Basin trail system.

Gail Ryba Trail 

Small asphalted branch trail that connects the Rail Trail to shopping areas, neighborhoods, and a medical center. The Gail Ryba Trail starts at Saint Michaels near the Hospital, joins the rail trail thru an underpass at Saint Francis Drive, and ends at West Zia Road. Approximately 1 mile long.

Spur Trail 

Improved natural surface trail that branches from the rail trail to connect to the Santa Fe Community College. The Spur Trail trailhead is located at the intersection of Richards Avenue and Avenida del Sur. Approximately 3 miles long.

References

External links 
 City of Santa Fe - Trails & Maps
 Santa Fe Conservation Trust
 SANTA FE METROPOLITAN PLANNING ORGANIZATION
 newspaper article about segment 2 in the Santa Fe New Mexican

rails with trails
rail trails in New Mexico
hiking trails in Santa Fe County, New Mexico
Santa Fe, New Mexico